Korucular is a Turkish word meaning "guards". It may refer to;
Korucular village guards system in Turkey
Korucular, Murgul  a village in Artvin Province  
Korucular, Mersin  a village in Mersin Province